Philip Priest (born 9 September 1966) is an English former professional footballer who played as a midfielder.

Career
Priest played for Chelsea, Blackpool, Brentford and Shrewsbury Town.

He also participated at the 1985 FIFA World Youth Championship.

References

1966 births
Living people
People from the Borough of Brentwood
English footballers
Association football midfielders
Chelsea F.C. players
Blackpool F.C. players
Brentford F.C. players
Shrewsbury Town F.C. players
English Football League players